Henry Martyn Blossom (May 10, 1866 – March 23, 1919) was an American playwright and lyricist.

Biography
Born in St. Louis, Missouri, he teamed with Victor Herbert on several popular operettas. His first Broadway musical project was The Yankee Consul (1904) for composer Alfred G. Robyn, after which he primarily wrote for Herbert, including Mlle. Modiste (1905), The Red Mill (1906), Baron Trenck (1911), The Only Girl (1914), The Princess Pat (1915), Eileen (1917), and Kiss Me Again (film version of Mlle. Modiste, 1931). He also wrote "When Uncle Sam is Ruler of the Sea" with Victor Herbert in 1916 for The Century Girl, "It's Not the Uniform That Makes the Man" with A. Baldwin Sloane in 1917 and "I Want to Go Back to the War" with Percival Knight (music was by Raymond Hubbell) in 1919.

Blossom was also involved with several shows that failed to reach Broadway. He died from pneumonia in New York City at the age of 53.

 Mlle. Modiste - libretto (1905)
 The Red Mill - book and lyrics (1906)
 The Only Girl - book and lyrics (1914)
The Princess Pat - book and lyrics (1915)
Eileen - lyrics (1917)

Checkers: A Hard Luck Story
Checkers: A Hard Luck Story, sometimes written as Checkers: A Hard-luck Story is a book written by Blossom in 1896. He adapted it into a successful play starring Thomas W. Ross. It was adapted into two silent films titled Checkers, the first directed by Augustus Thomas in 1913 and the second, Checkers in 1919. The plot involves a love story about a man trying to win approval of his would-be father-in-law as he faces career hurdles and tries to distance himself from gambling and horse racing.

1913 film
Eustace Hale Ball and Lawrence McGill wrote the scenario.

References

External links 

Hearts of Erin; a romantic comic opera / book and lyrics by Henry Blossom ; music by Victor Herbert (From the Sibley Music Library Digital Score Collection)

1866 births
1919 deaths
American lyricists
Writers from St. Louis